Bacharach is a town in western Germany.

Bacharach (or Bachrach) may also refer to:

 Bacharach (surname)
 Bacharach Giants, a former professional baseball team that played in the Negro leagues
 Cayley–Bacharach theorem
 Bachrach Studios
 Burt Bacharach, American songwriter and composer

See also
 Baccarat (disambiguation)